Lene Clausen (born 10 April 1992) is a Danish female badminton player.

Achievements

BWF International Challenge/Series
Women's Singles

 BWF International Challenge tournament
 BWF International Series tournament
 BWF Future Series tournament

References

External links
 

1992 births
Living people
Danish female badminton players
Badminton players at the 2010 Summer Youth Olympics
21st-century Danish women